The Jakarta Art Building, historically known as Schouwburg Weltevreden, is a concert hall in Sawah Besar, Central Jakarta, Indonesia, built during the colonial period in Batavia, Dutch East Indies.

History
The idea for the creation of a theater in Batavia (the colonial name for Jakarta) came from the Governor-General of Batavia at that time, Herman Willem Daendels. This idea was realized by Stamford Raffles, who was known for his passion for the study and preservation of local culture. In 1814 Raffles ordered the construction of a simple bamboo theatre near Waterlooplein (a square in Jakarta, now Lapangan Banteng), under the name "Military Theater Venue". It was built by English soldiers and had a capacity of 250 people. This first theater in Batavia was used from 1811 to 1816 for the entertainment of British soldiers.

In August 1816, the English gave the Indies back to the Dutch East Indies and Batavia was under the governorship of the Netherlands once more. Performances were again held in the building on April 21, 1817, by groups of Dutch amateur performers.

In 1820 the bamboo theater began to show signs of deterioration, and in 1821, supported by the Dutch colonial government, it was replaced with a more permanent structure. The architect chosen to design the building was J.C. Schultze (who also designed the Harmony Society, Batavia building. The contractor was Lie Atjie, who took material from the spinhuis in the old town area to use for the new theater. Construction took 14 months. The new building was designed in Neoclassical style and was called Schouwburg Weltevreden, also popularly known as Gedung Komedi ("Comedy building"). Inauguration was planned for October 1821 but had to be postponed until December 7 because of a cholera epidemic. The first performance in the building was Shakespeare's Othello.

During the mid 19th century, the development of Schouwburg Weltevreden was slow, and it had difficulty making a profit, because Batavia lacked European female opera singers and did not have a complete orchestra. The government took over the theater in 1848, when the private company failed, and held it until 1892. In 1911 its administration was assigned to the city of Batavia.

At first, lighting inside the building was done using candles and kerosene lamps. Gas light came in 1864. Electricity was first used inside the building in 1882, but gas light was still used outside until 1910.

In 1926, during Indonesia's period of National Awakening, the building was used by the local Youth Alliance for the first Kongres Pemoeda (Youth Congress).

During the Japanese occupation from 1942 to 1945, the building was used temporarily as a military headquarters. In April 1943 it was used as a theater under the name Sin'tsu Cekizyoo.

During the independence era the building was used as a meeting place for a group of youth artists known as Seniman Merdeka, ("Independent Artists"), among whom were Rosihan Anwar, Usmar Ismail, El Hakim, and HB Jassin. On August 29, 1945, twelve days after the official declaration of independence of Indonesia, the first president of Indonesia, Sukarno, inaugurated the Central Indonesian National Committee,  which had its first meeting in the building.

In 1951 the building was used by the Faculty of Economy and Law of Indonesia University. And from 1957 to 1961, the building was used by the Indonesian National Theater Academy.

The building was again changed its name to Bioskop Diana (Diana Theater) in 1968 and a year later an institution for the building was established under the leadership of Brigadier General Pimgadie. In 1970, the institution transformed the building into a cinema showing Chinese movies. It was known during this period as the City Theater.

In 1984 a Law was enacted to return the building to its original function. It was renovated at a cost of 3 billion rupiah. On September 5, 1987, it was renamed the Gedung Kesenian Jakarta, replacing the former name Gedung Kesenian Pasar Baru.

Facility

See also

 Java
 Merdeka Square, Jakarta

References

External links 

Opera houses in Indonesia
Colonial architecture in Jakarta
Tourist attractions in Jakarta
Cultural Properties of Indonesia in Jakarta
Theatres completed in 1821
Music venues completed in 1821
Central Jakarta